The 2005 Generac 500 was the seventh race for the 2005 American Le Mans Series season held at Road America.  It took place on August 21, 2005.

Official results

Class winners in bold.  Cars failing to complete 70% of winner's distance marked as Not Classified (NC).

Statistics
 Pole Position - #16 Dyson Racing - 1:53.042
 Fastest Lap - #2 ADT Champion Racing - 1:54.569
 Distance - 
 Average Speed -

External links
 

Road America
Road America 500
Road America 500
Road America 500